The Carnival Of Shrieking Youth is a theatre festival for young artists in Edmonton, Alberta. The festival was founded in 1993 by Scott Sharplin and has been run by longtime artistic director Karl Schreiner since 1998. The festival started as "a week of plays written, directed and performed by youth graduates of the Citadel Theatre's Teen Festival of the Arts" according to coverage of the festival's first season. It has since become an independent organization producing the plays of young playwrights from the Edmonton area, starring young actors and directors from the city.

References

Theatre festivals in Alberta
Festivals in Edmonton
1993 establishments in Alberta
Recurring events established in 1993